Pilgrim House is a traditional hotel and restaurant in Soest city, North Rhine-Westphalia, Germany. It was founded in 1304 and used mainly by pilgrims on Camino de Santiago.

In February 2005, the 700-year-old Pilgrimhaus was the official monument of the month in North Rhine-Westphalia.

See also 
List of oldest companies

References

External links 
Homepage
Facebook page
Twitter page

Hotels in Germany
Restaurants in Germany
Tourist attractions in North Rhine-Westphalia
14th-century establishments in the Holy Roman Empire